This is a summary of the highest scoring matches and biggest winning margins in the Premier League since its establishment in the 1992–93 season. The record score for the biggest win is 9–0, which has happened on four occasions. The first was Manchester United beating Ipswich Town at Old Trafford on 4 March 1995, the second being Leicester City beating Southampton F.C. at St Mary's Stadium on 25 October 2019 (which stands as not only a joint Premier League record, but also an all-time record away win in the English football's top tier), the third being Manchester United beating Southampton on 2 February 2021, also at Old Trafford. The most recent occasion was Liverpool beating Bournemouth on 27 August 2022 at Anfield.

The only other team to have scored nine times in a match are Tottenham Hotspur, in their 9–1 victory over Wigan Athletic at White Hart Lane on 22 November 2009. This game boasts the record total number of goals scored in one half of Premier League football (nine), and by one team in one half of Premier League football (eight, by Tottenham).

The highest scoring game is Portsmouth's 7–4 win against Reading at Fratton Park on 29 September 2007.

Highest scoring games

Biggest winning margin

References

 Highest-Scoring Games
Highest-Scoring Games
Highest-Scoring Games
Premier League Highest-Scoring Games
Highest-scoring association football matches